Košarkaški klub Smederevo 1953, commonly referred to as KK Smederevo 1953, is a men's basketball club based in Smederevo, Serbia. The club currently plays in the Second Regional League of Serbia  (4th-tier).

History
Club was founded by students of the University of Belgrade on July 28, 1953, under the name of KK Metalac (Serbian Cyrillic: КК Металац). In that time club was part of the Metalac Sports Society. The first club president was Kosta Perović, while the first coach (and also a player) was Roman Bruj.

The 2011–12 season of KLS was the first time the club competed in the top professional club league in Serbia.

Players

Coaches

  Dragan Marinković
  Zoran Todorović

Notable former players
  Branko Mirković
  Goga Bitadze
  Ognjen Jaramaz
  Rade Zagorac
  Darko Balaban

References

External links
 Profile „KK Smederevo 1953“ www.eurobasket.com 
 Profile, results and tables „KK Smederevo 1953“ www.srbijasport.net 

Basketball teams in Serbia
Basketball teams in Yugoslavia
Basketball teams established in 1953